Ritvars Suharevs (born 11 January 1999 in Dobele) is a Latvian weightlifter, and Junior World Champion competing in the 77 kg category until 2018 and 81 kg starting in 2018 after the International Weightlifting Federation reorganized the categories.

Career

Other Competitions
Suharevs' first major result came at the 2013 European Youth Championships held in Klaipėda, Lithuania where he won three golds; coming first in the overall classification along with the individual snatch and clean & jerk. The following year, in 2014, Suharevs won gold again at the European Youth Championships hosted in Ciechanów, this time in the −62 kg with a total lift of 256 kg. At the 2016 European Junior Championships, Ritvars came second in the −77kg class, finishing only a kilogram behind gold medalist Davit Hovhannisyan.

Major results

References

External links 
 
 
 
 
 
  

1999 births
Living people
Latvian male weightlifters
People from Dobele
Latvian strength athletes
European Weightlifting Championships medalists
Weightlifters at the 2020 Summer Olympics
Olympic weightlifters of Latvia
21st-century Latvian people